James Ryan R. Sena (born August 31, 1988) is a Filipino professional basketball player for the Blackwater Bossing of the Philippine Basketball Association (PBA). Sena played collegiate basketball at JRU Heavy Bombers.

PBA career statistics

As of the end of 2022–23 season

Season-by-season averages

|-
| align=left | 
| align=left | Shopinas.com / Air21
| 32 || 26.1 || .443 || .000 || .719 || 6.9 || 1.5 || .1 || .3 || 8.3
|-
| align=left rowspan=2| 
| align=left | Air21
| rowspan=2|32 || rowspan=2|13.9 || rowspan=2|.443 || rowspan=2|.000 || rowspan=2|.808 || rowspan=2|2.5 || rowspan=2|.6 || rowspan=2|.1 || rowspan=2|.1 || rowspan=2|4.0
|-
| align=left | Meralco
|-
| align=left | 
| align=left | Meralco
| 21 || 9.4 || .442 || — || .750 || 1.9 || .4 || .1 || .1 || 2.1
|-
| align=left | 
| align=left | Meralco
| 25 || 8.4 || .373 || — || .667 || 1.5 || .4 || .0 || .1 || 1.9
|-
| align=left | 
| align=left | Blackwater
| 26 || 15.9 || .474 || .286 || .857 || 2.7 || .8 || .3 || .2 || 3.8
|-
| align=left | 
| align=left | Blackwater
| 34 || 19.9 || .458 || .200 || .810 || 3.5 || .9 || .4 || .1 || 5.7
|-
| align=left | 
| align=left | Blackwater
| 28 || 15.0 || .397 || .278 || .667 || 2.9 || 1.1 || .1 || .1 || 4.0
|-
| align=left | 
| align=left | Blackwater
| 28 || 12.2 || .364 || .278 || .833 || 1.9 || .6 || .3 || .0 || 2.5
|-
| align=left | 
| align=left | San Miguel
| 6 || 3.2 || .250 || 1.000 || — || .3 || .0 || .0 || .0 || .5
|-
| align=left | 
| align=left | Blackwater
| 29 || 10.3 || .500 || .510 || .500 || 1.3 || .8 || .2 || .0 || 4.6
|-class=sortbottom
| align="center" colspan=2 | Career
| 261 || 14.8 || .438 || .362 || .741 || 2.8 || .8 || .2 || .1 || 4.2

References

1988 births
Living people
Air21 Express players
Basketball players from La Union
Blackwater Bossing players
Centers (basketball)
Filipino men's basketball players
Ilocano people
JRU Heavy Bombers basketball players
Meralco Bolts players
People from San Fernando, La Union
Power forwards (basketball)
San Miguel Beermen draft picks
San Miguel Beermen players